Julie Rovner is an American journalist and author. Currently the Chief Washington Correspondent for Kaiser Health News (KHN) and host of its podcast, "What the Health", Rovner previously reported for National Public Radio, National Journal's Congress Daily, Congressional Quarterly, and The Lancet.

Bibliography
Rovner, Julie. "Congress’s ‘catastrophic’ attempt to fix medicare." Intensive care: How Congress shapes health policy. Washington, DC: American Enterprise Institute and Brookings Institution, 1995.
Rovner, Julie. Health care policy and politics A to Z. Washington, D.C: CQ Press, 2009. Print.
Rovner, Julie. Prospects for health reform in 2009 and beyond : 20th anniversary lecture. Washington, D.C: National Academies Press, 2009. Print.

See also
Kaiser Family Foundation

References

External links
NPR stories by Julie Rovner
Kaiser Health News stories by Julie Rovner

American podcasters
NPR personalities
University of Michigan alumni
Year of birth missing (living people)
Living people